Derek Richardson Jr. (born January 18, 1976) is an American actor. He is best known for his TV roles on Men in Trees and Anger Management, and for starring as young Harry Dunne in the film Dumb and Dumberer: When Harry Met Lloyd.

Early life
Richardson was born in Queensbury, New York, the eldest of the five children of Ellen and Dr. Derek Richardson, a dermatologist.

Career
Upon moving to Los Angeles in 2002, he was cast in a recurring role on J. J. Abrams' Felicity as Keri Russell's love interest. He subsequently co-starred in the prequel to the Dumb and Dumber franchise Dumb and Dumberer: When Harry Met Lloyd as a younger version of Jeff Daniels' character, Harry Dunne.

Richardson starred opposite Jay Hernandez as one of the leads in the Lions Gate Entertainment horror film Hostel, directed by Eli Roth and executive-produced by Quentin Tarantino. His performance in the horror film garnered him a 2006 MTV Movie Award nomination for "Best Frightened Performance". In 2006, he began starring in the television show Men in Trees as "Patrick Bachelor".

From 2012-14, he played Nolan Johnson on all 100 episodes of the Charlie Sheen FX original series Anger Management.

Filmography

References

External links
 

1976 births
20th-century American male actors
21st-century American male actors
American male film actors
American male television actors
Colorado College alumni
Living people
Male actors from New York (state)
People from Queensbury, New York